Fight for Love is the studio second album by American singer Elliott Yamin. It was first released on May 5, 2009, by the independent label Hickory Records and distributed through Sony BMG-owned RED Distribution. Yamin recorded 35 songs from which to choose the final track list and worked with various producers including Jermaine Dupri, Dave Tozer, Eman, Harvey Mason, Jr., Steve Russell and Stargate. He described Fight for Love as more contemporary R&B pop than his debut with three or four more "radio-friendly" singles. Yamin co-wrote the majority of songs for the album, including "Someday," a song about his feelings of loss following the death of his mother to which he dedicated Fight for Love.

Several singles were issued in support of the album. The title track and lead single premiered on AOL Music on February 13, 2009. The song was released to online music services, including iTunes, and for adds at Top 40 and Rhythmic radio on March 10, 2009. Yamin shot two music videos, for "Fight for Love" as well as for the song "You Say", which became the second single in Japan. They were shot on April 11 and 12, 2009, in Los Angeles, California. The video for "Fight for Love" premiered on AOL Music on May 1, 2009. The second US single, "Can't Keep on Loving You (From a Distance)", was released to Adult Contemporary radio on August 10, 2009.

Critical reception

AllMusic editor Stephen Thomas Erlewine rated the album two and a half stars out of five. He found that "the problem for Yamin is that his husky voice bristles against the cold, sequenced rhythms that comprise Fight for Love, creating not tension but dissonance. Of course, it would help if he had compelling material, either songs or productions, but everything here feels written to convention instead of written to order. Yamin remains an ingratiating presence, possessed with a natural, almost accidental charm that's so endearing that it's hard not to wish that he was in warmer surroundings than these, or at least had a better collection of songs to sing." People remarked that the "likable Yamin largely eschews the old-school soul of 2007's self-titled debut for a more contemporary sound. Cuts like the title-track single and the Stargate-produced "Don't Be Afraid" find him smoothly moving in on Ne-Yo. But the songs [...] are not quite in Ne-Yo's league, and the slow-to-midtempo grooves start to blend together after a while."

Track listing

Notes
  signifies a vocal producer
  signifies a co-producer

Charts

Sales

Release history

References

2009 albums
Elliott Yamin albums
Avex Group albums
Albums produced by Josh Abraham
Albums produced by Oak Felder